Mahasamund is a city in Mahasamund District in the Indian state of Chhattisgarh.It is situated on the Mumbai-Kolkata and Raipur-Vishakhaptnam National Highways. It is one of the largest (ranked 13th) and most important cities in the State. The city is divided into 30 wards and 5 zones and is also the biggest city in the Trans-Mahanadi area. It is also the administrative headquarters of the Mahasamund District and part of the proposed new Mahasamund Municipal Corporation. The current mayor is Prakash Chandrakar. 
Reliance Trends, Vishal Megamart, Reliance Jio Smart Point, B mart and Zee Sale are prominent Shopping Centers of the City.

Geography
It has an average elevation of 318 metres (1043 feet). Mahasamund is 56 kilometres south-east of Raipur on the junction of National Highway 6 and National Highway 217 close to the Mahanadi River. Mahasamund city is an important station on the Raipur-Vizag rail route. Mahasamund and Raipur are the only district headquarter cities which are close to the state capital of Chhattisgarh, Naya Raipur.

Demographics
 Indian census, Mahasamund has a population of 112,228. Males constitute 51% of the population and females constitute 49%. Mahasamund has an average literacy rate of 70%; male literacy is 79% and female literacy is 61%. 14% of the population is under 6 years of age. The estimated population in 2014 is above one lakh.

Transport
Mahasamund is 55 kilometres from Raipur, 105 kilometres from Dhamtari, 30 kilometres from Rajim, 160 kilometres from Bilaspur, 95 kilometres from Durg, 85 kilometres from Bhilai, 115 kilometres from Saraipali, 180 kilometres from Bargarh and 250 kilometres from Sambalpur.

Bus
Guru Ghasi Das bus terminal in Mahasamund is well connected to its nearby cities. There are regular bus services to Raipur, Bilaspur, DurgSaraipali, Baloda Bazar Bemetara, Simga, Rajim, Narshinghnath (Odisha) Sarangarh, Gariyaband, Khariar Road, Nuapada, Berhampur, Asika and Bhawanipatna.

Rail
Mahasamund has two railway stations: the Mahasamund railway station and the Belsonda station. The Mahasamund railway station is an important station on the East Coast Railway zone. Dualling of the railway track from Raipur Mahasamund to Titilagarh has been completed and electric engine started running in 2019. The Rail Ministry sanctioned a new railway manager division headquarters at Mahasamund.

Mahasamund railway station is situated on the Raipur Vishakhapatnam railway line. There are regular trains for Bhubaneswar, Puri, Vishakhapatnam, Durg, Raipur, Bilaspur, Korba, Nagpur, Mumbai, Delhi, Bhopal, Titilagarh, Sambalpur, Bhawanipatna, Ahmedabad, Gandhidham, New Delhi, Tirupati, Shirdi, Vijayawada, Agra, Itarsi, Bhusawal, Nanded, Jodhpur, Katni, Sagar, Shahdol and Anuppur.

Air
Swami Vivekananda Airport Raipur is just 40 kilometres south-east from Mahasamund.

Roads
Mahasamund is well connected to major Indian cities through National Highway 6 and National Highway 217. The construction of improving National Highway 6 to a four-lane road from Mahasamund to Odisha is in progress.

City bus
The state government approved a city bus project in Mahasamund City. Under the Jnurm scheme, the city government sanctioned a 9 single-decker city bus for Mahasamund City.

Entertainment
Mahasamund has two cinemas, Vithoba Cineplex and ShriRam Talkies.

Education
Mahasamund City is the educational hub for the nearby areas. Some of the leading institutes are
 Weidner memorial Senior Secondary School CBSE Pattern
 Kendriya Vidyalaya, CBSE Pattern B.T.I. road Mahasamund.
 New Holy Faith School CBSE Pattern Pitiyajhar Mahasamund.
 Maharishi Public School CBSE Pattern Machewa Mahasamund.
 Saraswati Higher Secondary School CG Board Bhalesar Road Mahasamund.
 Shishu Sanskar Kendra Higher Secondary School CG Board College Road Mahasamund.
 Good Shepherd Higher Secondary School CG Board Ayodhya Nagar Mahasamund.
 Shyam Vidya Higher Secondary School CG Board Ayodhya Nagar Mahasamund.
 DMS Higher Secondary School CG Board
 Vrindavan Higher Secondary School CG Board Imlibhatha Mahasamund.
 Mata Gayatri Higher Secondary School CG Board Nayapara Mahasamund.
 Ashi Bai Golcha Girls Higher Secondary School CG Board Lohiya Chowk Mahasamund.
 Govt. Model Boys Higher Secondary School CG Board Nehru Chowk Mahasamund.
 Chhattisgarh Higher Secondary School CG Board NH 353 Bagbahra Road Mahasamund.
 Dream India Public School CBSE Pattern Baronda Chowk Mahasamund.
 Chandroday Public School NH 353 Bagbahra Road Mahasamund.
 Riverdale World School Pitiyajhar Mahasamund.
 Green Valley School Ashram Complex Mahasamund.
 Carmel Public School, Pitiyajhar Mahasamund.
 Sanskar Public School College Road Mahasamund.
 Jagannathi High School Station Road Mahasamund.

Colleges
 Mahasamund Medical College.
 Mahaprabhu Vallabhcharya Govt. PG College, Machewa Mahasamund.
 Mata Karma Govt. PG Girls College, Machewa Mahasamund.
 Shantri Bai Arts;Science and Commerce College, Bagbahra Road NH 353 Mahasamund.
 Govt. Collage of Agriculture and Research Station, Kanpa, Post-Birkoni, District-Mahasamund.
 Jai Hind College, Bhalesar Road Mahasamund.
 Govt. Polytechnic College, Baronda Bazar Mahasamund.
 Govt. Vetnary Hospital and Polytechnic College, Baronda Bazar Mahasamund.
 Govt. Livelihood College, Baronda Bazar Mahasamund.
 Indian College, Belsonda Raipur Road Mahasamund.
 Shyam B ED College Ayodhya Nagar Mahasamund.
 Govt. Forest Guard Training Centre Near Collectorate Mahasamund.

Economy
The economy of Mahasamund is based on agriculture and mining. Rice is the main crop grown here. The black stone of this area is mined for tiles; Mahasamund also has many stone-cutting factories. The industrial area of Birkoni and Belsonda is just 10 and 05 km respectively.

Banks
Mahasamund is home to branches of all the major public and private sector banks in India. These include Axis Bank, State Bank of India Main Branch, Collectorate Road Branch, Station, Station Road Branch, HDFC Bank, ICICI Bank, IDBI Bank, Bank of Maharashtra, Allahabad Bank, Vijaya Bank, Bank of India, Union Bank, Uco Bank, Punjab National Bank, Dena Bank, Central Bank, Laxmi Vilas Bank and Canara Bank Bank of Baroda  Bandhan Bank Indian Bank as well as around 30 ATMs located all around the city.

Important Offices
Income Tax Office, Labour Court, 20 RR battalion, Child Remand Home, Dean Medical College, Central Jail, National Highway Projects, Railway Sections Proposed ADRM Railway, Railway Yard, FCI, Polytechnic Engg. And Vetnary, Weather information center, Housing Board Corporation Divisional, PWD Division, PHE division and all kinds of district level offices are also located.

Culture and religion
About 90 percent population of the city follow Hinduism. People from all over India have settled here.

Politics
Mahasamund is the very high profile and one of the 11 parliament constituency in the state of Chhattisgarh. This constituency is the seat of former Union Minister Vidya Charan Shukla who contested 12 lok sabha elections in which he won 11 and 1 loss against first Chief Minister Ajit Jogi. In the 2014 general election Ajit Jogi lost the election against BJP candidate Chandu lal Sahu.

The assembly segments are Mahasamund, Saraipali, Basna, Khallari, Bindranawagarh, Rajim, Dhamtari, and Kurud.

The Member of legislative Assembly from Mahasamund constituency is Dr. Vimal Chopra (Independent).

Tourism
Tourist sites in and around Mahasamund include Sirpur, the ancient capital of South Kosal and famous for its Lakshman temple, Buddha Vihar and many archaeological sites. The state government has decided to develop this area as a World Heritage site. Other nearby tourist sites include Kodar Dam, Rajim Kumbh, Rajiv Lochan Temple, and Khallari Temple. The birthplace of Mahaprabhu Vallabhacharya is in nearby Champaran.

Localities

 Ayodhya Nagar
 Vardhman Nagar
 RamRahim Nagar
 Imlibhatha
 NayaPara
 Shankar Nagar
 Trimurti Colony
 Shubhash Nagar
 Laldharhi Para
 Club Para
 Aadarsh Nagar
 Pitiyajhar
 Mahamaya Para
 Mahavir Park
 Shivalik Park
 Jagat Vihar Colony, also known as Kaushik Colony
 Shri Ram Vatika
 Megh Basant
 Civil Line
 New Civil Line
 Mahavir Colony
 Punjabi Para
 Gujrati Para
 Naya Rawan bhatha Para
 Chipiya Para
 Khaira
 Bemcha
 Labhra
 Purana Rawan bhatha Para
 Machewa
 Bemcha
 Housing Board Colony
 RamanTola
 Mahauri Bhatha
 ShriRam colony
 Gudru Para
 Purani Basti
 Beldar Para
 Sanjay Nagar
 Auto Colony
 IsaiPara
 Ganjpara
 Purana Machali Market

References

Cities and towns in Mahasamund district